Nathan Angus Baskerville is a former Democratic member of the North Carolina House of Representatives, who represented the 32nd district from 2013 to 2017. Baskerville also has his own law practice.

During the 2015 legislative session, Baskerville is one of 22 African Americans in the North Carolina House of Representatives.

Committee assignments

2015-2016 session
Appropriations
Appropriations - Transportation
Judiciary III (Vice Chair)
Environment
Insurance

2013-2014 session
Appropriations
Judiciary
Insurance
Agriculture
Health and Human Services

Electoral history

2014

2012

References

External links
 
Legislative page
Twitter account

Living people
1981 births
People from Henderson, North Carolina
Morehouse College alumni
North Carolina Central University alumni
20th-century African-American people
North Carolina lawyers
21st-century American politicians
21st-century African-American politicians
African-American state legislators in North Carolina
Democratic Party members of the North Carolina House of Representatives